Sharon Ooja Egwurube (born 6 April 1991) is a Nigerian actress. She came into the limelight after she played the role of "Shalewa" in the web series Skinny Girl in Transit.

Biography
Sharon Ooja Egwurube is from the Idoma tribe of Benue state. She was born in Kaduna State [Plateau State]]. She has three sisters. She attended Kings and Queens School, Jos, for her primary education. For her secondary education, she attended two all-girls schools – Regina Pacis Secondary School, Garki II, Abuja, and St. Louis Girls’ College, Jos. Both were boarding schools
She started her acting career when she moved to Lagos in 2013. She revealed in an interview with a Nigerian Tabloid, Punch newspaper how she got into acting. According to Sharon, it all began when she was at a photo session for a store and NdaniTV was covering the behind-the-scenes activities of the shoot. The next week, she was invited for an interview for a television show that did not happen. Shortly afterwards, she was called to play in a small role in the television series, Gidi Up. Sharon also featured in Skinny Girl in Transit, where she played the character Shalewa.

Sharon is a graduate of mass communication from Houdegbe North American University Benin. She hosted GT Bank's Fashion week red carpet alongside Timini Egbuson in 2017.

She was listed as a top female celebrity of 2020 and a Nollywood actress to look forward to in 2021.
Sharon Ooja was among many others selected by Netflix to represent Nigeria in the program organized titled "The Bridgerton Affair" in South Africa  She fell ill during the remake of the movie Glamour Girls.

Filmography

TV shows

Movies

Awards and nominations

References

Living people
21st-century Nigerian actresses
1991 births
Nigerian film actresses
People from Benue State